Ruka Yamaya (born 10 February 1995) is a Japanese professional footballer who plays as a midfielder for WE League club Albirex Niigata Ladies.

Club career 
Yamaya made her WE League debut on 12 September 2021.

References 

Living people
1995 births
Japanese women's footballers
Women's association football midfielders
WE League players
Albirex Niigata Ladies players
Association football people from Hokkaido